is a private university in the town of Kumatori in Osaka Prefecture, Japan. The predecessor of the school was founded in 1920, and it was chartered as a junior women's college in 1985. In 2000 it became a co-ed four-year college. The present name of the school was adopted in 2006.

References

External links
 Official website 
 Official website 

Educational institutions established in 1920
Private universities and colleges in Japan
Universities and colleges in Osaka Prefecture
1920 establishments in Japan
Kumatori, Osaka